Kostas Voutsas (born Konstantinos Savvopoulos (31 December 1931 – 26 February 2020) was a Greek actor, director, and writer.

Personal life
Voutsas was born in Vyronas, Athens in 1931 to a refugee family from Epivates, and moved to Thessaloniki in 1932. He studied drama at the Drama School of the Macedonian Conservatory of Thessaloniki and made his stage and screen debut in 1953. His breakthrough came in 1961, when Giannis Dalianidis gave him a key part in his phenomenally successful youth melodrama Ο Κατήφορος (1961). He soon became one of the best and most popular comic actors of his generation and created personal groups, starring in many Greek comedies by top play-writers and classics like Aristophanes' "Sfikes" (as Philokleon), Molière's "Le bourgeois gentilhomme" (title role) etc. He also starred in about 60 movies, mostly comedies and musicals of the 'golden era' of Greek commercial cinema and received a Lifetime Achievement Award at the Thessaloniki Film Festival in 1984.

Voutsas was the father of Alexandra (Sandra) Voutsa from his marriage with Erika Broyer, Theodora Voutsa and Nikoleta Voutsa from his marriage to Theano Papaspirou  and Fivos Voutsas from his fourth and last marriage in 2016, with Aliki Katsavou. With his 3rd wife Evi Karagianni didn't have any children and was a stepfather for her child Anthemos Ananiades.

Voutsas died of a lung infection on 26 February 2020 at an Athens hospital, aged 88.

Career
He was a major actor in Finos Films and went on to star in about 60 movies, mostly comedies and musicals of the 'golden era" of Greek commercial cinema.

In 1961 his breakthrough came when the Greek film director Giannis Dalianidis gave him a leading role in his phenomenally successful youth melodrama O Katiforos. He soon became one of the best and most popular comic actors of his generation and created personal groups, starring in many Greek comedies by top playwrights and classics like Aristophanes' The Wasps (as Philokleon), Molière's Le bourgeois gentilhomme (title role), etc.

He was always more committed to being a theatrical actor. In an interview with the Athens daily newspaper To Vima, he said: "Playing in movies has helped me a lot, but I was always committed to the theatre and that was my highlight."
His acting technique is being studied at the University of Patras. He received many lifetime achievement awards: Thessaloniki International Film Festival and more.

Filmography

Cine movies

TV series 

Actor:
 Nou Dou Fun Park (2008) (TV/Theatre)
 Oti peite upourge mou (1998) (TV/Theatre) .... Richard Willow
 Ena agathi sto stefani mou (1989) (V) .... Dimitris
 Glykeia mou Koutsi, apo to Halkoutsi (1988) (V) .... Kostas .... a.k.a. Glykeia mou koutsi (Greece: reissue title)
 I zoi arhizei sta saranta (1988) (V)
 O erotiaris gatos (1988) (V) .... Kostas
 Kalokairinos erastis (1988) (V) .... Kostas
 O antras tis hronias (1988) (V) .... Akis
 I love thranio (1988) (V) .... Schoolmaster
 O kourdistos erastis (1987) (V) .... Kostas
 Areso kai kykloforo (1986) (V) .... Babis .... a.k.a. Kai leftas kai adekaros (Greece: alternative title)

Voice actor:
 Up (2009) .... Carl Fredricksen (Greek voice)

Director:
 "Nou Dou Fun Park" (2008) (TV)
 "Allagi... kai to louri tis manas" (1982) .... a.k.a. Enas kleftis ston Paradeiso (Greece: TV title)
 "O anthropos mas" (1975) TV series

Writer:
 "Istories horis dakria" (1991) TV series (writer)
 "Gabros me to zori" (1990) (V) (writer)
 "Ta touvla" (1985) (idea)

Achievements
In 1984 he received a Lifetime Achievement Award at the Thessaloniki Film Festival.

See also
 List of oldest fathers

References

External links
 
 http://www.tovima.gr/default.asp?pid=2&ct=4&artId=314482&dt=10/02/2010 (in Greek)

1931 births
2020 deaths
Greek male film actors
Greek male stage actors
Actors from Thessaloniki
Greek Macedonians